Ed Hill is an American politician from Montana serving as a Republican member of the Montana House of Representatives for district 28.

Early life
Hill was born in 1959 in Havre, Montana. He graduated from Havre High School, and earned an Associate of Arts from Johnson County Community College. He worked for the BNSF Railway.

Montana House of Representatives
Hill was elected to the Montana House of Representatives as a result of the 2020 general election. He assumed office on January 4, 2021.
On November 8, 2022, Ed was defeated by Paul Tuss.

Personal life
Hill is married to Heidi Hill, and they have one daughter.

References 

Living people
Republican Party members of the Montana House of Representatives
People from Havre, Montana
21st-century American politicians
1959 births